A ICS Form 219, Resource Status Card or T-Card, is a simple tool to record and track the location and status of individuals, teams, vehicles, and other equipment. It is part of the standardised Incident Command System now widely used by police, fire departments, and emergency management agencies to manage their responses to incidents.

The cards are so-named because they are made of card stock and have a T-like shape. These cards are displayed in resource status or “T-Card racks” (typically a sheet of plastic or metal with slots cut to accept the body of the card) where they can be easily viewed, retrieved and updated during the course of the incident.

T-Card Design
Each card is printed in a different color of card stock and used for a different resource category, kind, or type:

 219-1: Header Card – Gray (used only as label cards for T-Card racks)
 219-2: Crew Card – Green
 219-3: Engine Card – Rose
 219-4: Helicopter Card – Blue
 219-5: Personnel Card – White
 219-6: Aircraft Card – Orange
 219-7: Heavy Equipment Card – Yellow
 219-8: Misc. Equipment/Task Force Card – Tan
 219-10: Generic Card – Light Purple

In the United States, T-Cards are found in one of these sizes:
 #1 T-Card: 1" × 2"
 #2 T-Card: 2" × 3"
 #3 T-Card: 3" × 4" (over-sized cards 8" long are also common)
 #4 T-Card: 4" × 7"

3 T-Cards are the most commonly used, and the over-sized version is the size used in the official FEMA ICS 219 forms.

In the UK, these sizes are in common use:
 Size 1: 16.5×49mm
 Size 2: 48.5×85mm
 Size 3: 80×120mm
 Size 4: 112×180mm

Commercial Vendors
  T-Card Systems (Better Way Inc.)
  Magnatag Visible Systems
  COPART
  Nobo Europe T-Card Planning

References
  ICS Forms Stakeholder Review Draft
  Official ICS cards on FEMA site

Emergency services in the United States